Air Marshal Sir Charles Ronald Steele,  (9 November 1897 – 14 February 1973) was a Royal Air Force officer who became Air Officer Commanding-in-Chief at Coastal Command from 1950 to 1952.

RAF career
Educated at Oundle School and the Royal Military College, Sandhurst, Steele was commissioned into the Green Howards in 1916. He transferred into the Royal Flying Corps and became a flying ace credited with seven aerial victories. He transferred into the Royal Air Force after the First World War and was granted a permanent commission on 1 August 1919. He was appointed Officer Commanding No. 18 Squadron in 1936 and served in the Second World War, initially on the Air Staff at Headquarters No. 3 Group, and then at the Rhodesian Air Training Group before being appointed Senior Air Staff Officer and then temporary Air Officer Commanding at No. 9 Group. He went on to be Air Officer Commanding No. 10 Group and then Air Officer Commanding No. 85 Group. He was made Senior Air Staff Officer at the Headquarters of the British Air Forces of Occupation in Germany in July 1945. He became Air Officer Commanding AHQ Malta in 1947 and Air Officer Commanding-in-Chief at Coastal Command in 1950 before retiring in 1952.

References

1897 births
1973 deaths
Royal Air Force air marshals
Graduates of the Royal Military College, Sandhurst
Green Howards officers
Royal Flying Corps officers
Knights Commander of the Order of the Bath
Recipients of the Distinguished Flying Cross (United Kingdom)
Royal Air Force personnel of World War II
Deputy Lieutenants of Cambridgeshire
People educated at Oundle School
English cricketers
Royal Air Force cricketers
British Army personnel of World War I
Royal Air Force personnel of World War I
Military personnel from Yorkshire